Charles Alfred Strange (November 12, 1909 – May 4, 1992) was a politician in Ontario, Canada. He was a CCF member of the Legislative Assembly of Ontario from 1943 to 1945 who represented the riding of Brantford.

Background
He was born in Portslade, Essex, the son of George Frederick Strange and Louisa Bird, and came to Canada in 1930. In 1934, Strange married Olive M. Pizzey. He was a trade union committee secretary. Strange moved to Simcoe, where he worked in personnel at the American Can Company, in 1947. He was a member of the St. John Ambulance. Strange died in Simcoe at the age of 82.

Politics
He ran as the CCF candidate in the 1943 provincial election. He defeated Liberal incumbent Louis Hagey by 1,049 votes. He served as a member of the official opposition behind CCF leader Ted Jolliffe. In the 1945 election he was defeated by Progressive Conservative candidate Stanley Dye by 2,516 votes.

References

External links

1909 births
1992 deaths
Ontario Co-operative Commonwealth Federation MPPs
20th-century Canadian politicians